"Hush, Little Baby" is a traditional lullaby, thought to have been written in the Southern United States. The lyrics are from the point of view of a mother trying to appease a crying child by promising to give it a gift. Sensing the child's apprehension, the mother has planned a series of contingencies in case her gifts don't work out. The simple structure allows more verses to be added ad lib. It has a Roud number of 470.

History and traditional versions 
Like most folk songs, the author and date of origin are unknown. The English folklorist Cecil Sharp collected and notated a version from Endicott, Franklin County, Virginia in 1918, and another version sung by a Julie Boone of Micaville, North Carolina, with a complete version of the lyrics. A version recorded on a wax cylinder around 1929–35 in Durham, North Carolina by James Madison Carpenter can be heard online via the Vaughan Williams Memorial Library website. 

Alan Lomax recorded several varying traditional renditions of the song in the southern United States in the 1930s and 40s, including from the traditional singer Texas Gladden. All of these versions differ melodically and lyrically, to varying degrees, from the now popular version.

One of the versions recorded by Lomax was that of the influential Appalachian musician Jean Ritchie, who performed a version in 1949 that had been passed down in her family. 

The Ritchie family version is identical to the versions which would later become famous. Due to the melodic and lyrical diversity of other traditional recordings and the fact that Ritchie shared a stage with and directly influenced artists who would later record the song such as The Weavers and Joan Baez, it is likely that the popular version of the song descends from Jean Ritchie's Kentucky family.

Popular versions 
The song has been performed and recorded by many artists including Joan Baez, Burl Ives, Regina Spektor, Nina Simone, The Weavers and the Mormon Tabernacle Choir. Additionally, the song has been adapted into pop songs such as Maurice King's "Hambone", Inez and Charlie Foxx's "Mockingbird" and Bo Diddley's eponymous song "Bo Diddley", as well as Bobby McFerrin and Yo-Yo Ma's "Hush Little Baby" and Eminem's "Mockingbird".

Aretha Franklin, Carly Simon, James Taylor, Etta James, Taj Mahal and Dusty Springfield have each recorded "Mockingbird", which is an R&B variant of the song.

Lyrics 
There are a multitude of different versions of the song.  It has a simple structure consisting of a series of rhyming couplets, where a gift is given to the little baby.  In the next couplet, the gift is found faulty in some way, and a new gift is presented.  The song continues in this pattern as long as the singer likes; and can come up with new gifts that fit the rhyming pattern.  An example of some common couplets used in the transcript of the Target commercial "Strawberry Shortcake" (2004):

See also
List of nursery rhymes

References

Lullabies
List songs
American nursery rhymes
Songwriter unknown
Year of song unknown
Jean Ritchie songs